Kumeko Urabe (October 5, 1902 – October 26, 1989) was a Japanese movie actress, and one of the first in the country. Born Kimura Kume, she also adopted the stage names Kumeko Ichijo, Toyama Midori, Chidori Shizuura and Chidori Toyama. She worked on stage and in film and television. Urabe was born in a rural part of the Shizuoka Prefecture. She lived in several homes while growing up, as she relocated with her father, a Buddhist priest, among the temples to which he was assigned. Urabe completed her education in Numazu, and left school in 1919 to join a theatre company, touring under various stage names as an actor and dancer.

In 1923, Urabe auditioned at the film studio Nikkatsu, and adopted the name Kumeko Urabe, by which she was known for the rest of her life. She appeared in her first film the following year, and continued to act until 1987. She worked with such directors as Kenji Mizoguchi and Mikio Naruse, and performed in over 320 films, including Ikiru, Older Brother, Younger Sister, Portrait of Madame Yuki, She Was Like a Wild Chrysanthemum, and Street of Shame. She also starred in television dramas, including thirteen episodes of Toshiba Sunday Theatre between 1958 and 1980. In the following decade, she carved a niche as a Grandma idol, until her death in 1989.

Biography

Early life
Kimura Kume  was born on October 5, 1902, the daughter of Keichu Kume, a Rinzai priest at Kenchō-ji, and Hana Kume. She grew up in the rural district of Kamo as an only child, her one sibling, an older brother, having died when he was young. In 1909, the family moved to Kawazu, also in Shizuoka Prefecture, where Kume attended the primary school. In 1915, the family moved again, this time to Numazu, where her father served at the Myōshin-ji temple. Kume finished her formal schooling two years later, attending Numazu Girls' School. During this time, her interest in acting had been formed by seeing Rensageki, a form that mixed silent film and stage play. In 1919, she left school and joined Yasuyoshi Suzuki's troupe, adopting the stage name Kumeko Ichijo.

Over the next four years, Kume joined travelling theatres and opera companies, perfecting her singing and dance routines, as well as learning to act in many roles. She also adopted a number of stage names, including Toyama Midori, Chidori Shizuura, and Chidori Toyama. It was also during this time that she met Chieko Saga: the pair became known as "Sagachi" and "Tochi".

Movie career

In August 1923, Yasumasa Hatano recommended that she audition at the film studio Nikkatsu. Urabe was successful, and adopted the stage name Kumeko Urabe, which she retained for the rest of her career with pride. In fact, decades later, she objected to her birth name on the Medal of Honour with Purple Ribbon, saying that the award was for the work of Kumeko Urabe. She appeared in her first film in 1924, playing the heroine in the film . She was one of the first female actors in Japanese cinema. Her skills attracted the attention of the director Kenji Mizoguchi, who cast her alongside Denmei Suzuki in the film , released in the same year.

After this, Urabe became one of the most popular members of the studio, after Yoneko Sakai and Haruko Sawamura. She developed a close relationship with the director, even being by his side when he was attacked by Yuriko Ichiro, the scar from which became what Tokuzo Tanaka calls Mizoguchi's badge of honour. After a brief break from acting between 1928 and 1930, she appeared in Mizoguchi's next film Tojin Okichi . Up to this point she had almost exclusively starred in silent films. In July 1933, she left the studio to join Shinkō Kinema, which in 1942 became Daiei Film. It was during this time that she first appeared in talking pictures.

Urabe continued to appear in films after the Second World War. The 1947 film Koisuru Tsuma  was her first with director Ryo Hagiwara. In 1952, she played the role of Watanabe Kanji's wife Tatsu in Akira Kurosawa's film Ikiru . In the same year, she appeared in Mikio Naruse's . She subsequently worked with Naruse in  released the following year and became one of his stable group of actors. She also rejoined Mizoguchi for his final film, released in 1956. Her movies also reached an increasingly international audience. For example, in 1955, she appeared in Hiromichi Horikawa's , which was released with English subtitles as Tomorrow I'll be a Fire Tree.

During the 1960s, Urabe continued to be cast in films, often in the role of a grandma, as in Keisuke Kinoshita's , which was released in English in 1967 as Eyes, the Sea and a Ball.

By the end of her career, Urabe had appeared in over 320 films and worked with some of the most well-known directors in Japanese cinema. During her life, she received a number of accolades, including the Medal of Honour with Purple Ribbon in 1966 and the individual merit award at the inaugural Fumiko Yamaji Film Awards in 1977.

Other work
In addition to her movie career, Urabe expanded her repertoire by appearing in television drama, firstly in episodes of There Are People Here which were aired in 1957 and 1959. She subsequently went on to play many roles, increasingly of grandmothers, in other shows, including Sharp Tuesday Theatre and Toshiba Sunday Theatre. In the latter case, she appeared in a total of thirteen episodes in the period between 1958 and 1980, her last in the 1228th episode, titled . After 1980, Urabe increasingly found work as a Grandma Idol. She was at the time the oldest debut singer in history.

Private life
On October 23, 1928, Urabe married Koichi Ueno, the son of a wealthy man from Kyoto. The couple gambled heavily, and the marriage ended in divorce in April 1930. Urabe never remarried. In her free time, she enjoyed mahjong and gambled on bicycle and boat races. On October 25, 1989, the stove in her Tokyo apartment set alight her clothing and she was severely burned. Taken to Tokyo Medical University Hospital in Nishi-Shinjuku, she died of her injuries the next day.

Filmography

Film
Urabe appeared in over 320 films including:

 1924, Come.
 1924, Omatsu.
 1924, Pearlko, Senami Chinami.
 1924, Supein no hato.
 1925, Yuriko.
 1925, Village daughter.
 1925, Tsubame Musume.
 1925, Yukie.
 1925, Kuma's wife, Yu
 1927, Miyako Hayashida.
 1930, Omatsu.
 1931, Atsuko's mother.
 1933, Ogin.
 1934, Jailer.
 1936, Yutaka.
 1937, Midwife Murai Ume.
 1938, Shinkichi's second wife.
 1942, Kinbe's wife.
 1943, Weruenke.
 1948, Aunt of pimp.
 1949, Iku.
 1949, Odai.
 1950,  Aunt Karasawa and Otami.
 1950, A Mother's Love
 1950,  San.
 1951, Auntie.
 1951, Watanabe wife, Tatsu.
 1951, Shige Taniguchi.
 1952, Osamu.
 1953, Kayo Nojima.
 1953, Riki.
 1953, Otsune.
 1954, Teacher's wife.
 1954, Shige.
 1955, Minko's grandmother.
 1955, Minko's grandmother.
 1955, Shige.
 1956, Otane.
 1956, Fujita.
 1958, Chie Kuwata.
 1958, Osamu's mother.
 1960, Mine Matsumoto.
 1962, Zamameba Asan Waka.
 1962, Ino.
 1962, Ume Nakagome.
 1964, Bar madam at Ginzang hot-spring.
 1964, Jakoman and Tetsu , Taka.
 1966, Hisako Kanematsu.

 1967, Kura Ninotani.
 1967, . Mishima Nui.
 1968, Old guest.
 1968, Oume.
 1968, Ume Suzuki.

 1973, Grandma Kadoya.
 1973, Mother.
 1977, Daikoku of the Temple.
 1980, Ushima Zuyo.
 1985, Fuki Inoue.
 1987, Mrs Uchigi.

TV
Urabe has appeared in over 100 TV episodes, including:

 NHK – 
 1957, Episodes 26 & 27 
 1959, Episode 77 .
 KRT/TBS – Toshiba Sunday Theatre . 13 episodes including:
 1958, 91 Oki Letter 
 1964, 416 
 1973 890 
 1980 1228 .
 1961, CX –  "Like Nogiku" .
 1966, TBS – Keisuke Kinoshita Hour  "Memorial Tree" .
 1971, NTV – .
 1981–1982, TBS – When Hamanasu flowers bloom .
 1988, NTV – Female Lawyer Ayuko Takabayashi: 4 Shinshu Iida Line Tenryukyo Gorge .

Writing
Urabe authored a number of books including:
 Urabe, Kumeko  Tokyo: Tokyo Engei Tsūshinsha, 1925 
 Urabe, Kumeko  Tokyo: Shikai Shobō, 1985 
 Urabe, Kumeko  Tokyo: Kawade Shobō Shinsha, 1985 
 Urabe, Kumeko; Sugai, Ichiro and Kawazu, Seizaburo  Tokyo: Rikugei Shobo, 1966

References

Citations

Bibliography
 
 
 
 
 
 
 
 
 
 
 
 
 
 
 
 
 
 
 
 

1902 births
1989 deaths
Actors from Shizuoka Prefecture
Japanese film actresses
Japanese silent film actresses
Japanese television actresses
Deaths from fire in Japan